Sergey Tatevosyan (born 4 January 1973) is a Russian former professional boxer who competed from 2000 to 2007.

Professional career

Tatevosyan made his professional debut on 29 January 2000, when he beat countryman Alexander Komarov on technical knockout in the fourth round. On 24 June 2000, he won for the first time the Russia middleweight title to Nikolay Talalakin. In 2003, he won vacant WBC International middleweight title by unanimous decision against Ghanaian boxer James Obede Toney.

Tatevosyan fought Lucian Bute on 26 January 2007 in Montreal for WBO Inter-Continental super middleweight title. He lost fight by unanimous decision 120-108, 119-109, 119-109 at the Bell Centre.

Professional boxing record

References

External links
 

1973 births
Living people
Sportspeople from Novosibirsk
Russian people of Armenian descent
Armenian male boxers
Super-middleweight boxers
Russian male boxers
Southpaw boxers